New York College or College of New York may mean:

 City College of New York
 Metropolitan College of New York
 New York Central College
 New York Chiropractic College, now Northeast College of Health Sciences
 New York City College of Technology
 New York College of Health Professions
 New York College of Podiatric Medicine
 New York Institute of Technology College of Osteopathic Medicine
 New York Medical College
 New York State College of Ceramics at Alfred University

See also
 College of the City of New York (disambiguation)
 State University of New York
 University of New York (disambiguation)